Paul Collomp (15 December 1885 – 25 November 1943) was a French scholar specialized in the history of Ptolemaic Kingdom. He was shot by the Gestapo during a raid against the University of Strasbourg pulled back to Clermont-Ferrand.

Works 
1926: Recherches sur la chancellerie et la diplomatique des Lagides, (thesis).
1927: La papyrologie, introduction à cette discipline.
1928: Michel Andrieu et Paul Collomp, Fragments sur papyrus de l'anaphore de Saint Marc, in Revue des sciences religieuses, (p. 500–501).
1931: La critique des textes, Paris, Belles lettres, 128 p.

References

Bibliography 
 Gustave Dupont-Ferrier, Nécrologie, Comptes rendus de l'Académie des inscriptions et belles-lettres, 87, 1943, (p. 589–590).

External links 
 Paul Collomp on data.bnf.fr
 Éloge funèbre de M. Paul Collomp, correspondant français de l'Académie des Inscriptions et Belles-Lettres

People from Niort
1885 births
1943 deaths
French hellenists
French papyrologists
École Normale Supérieure alumni
Academic staff of the University of Strasbourg
Recipients of the Croix de Guerre 1914–1918 (France)
French Resistance members
Chevaliers of the Légion d'honneur